Sussex is traditionally split into two halves, East Sussex and West Sussex. Lists of windmills in Sussex are contained in the following articles:

List of windmills in East Sussex
List of windmills in West Sussex